Baza Sportivă ARCOM, also known as Baza Sportivă FCSB is a sports complex in Bucharest, Romania. It is currently used only for football matches, is the home ground of FCSB II and FCSB Academy and also used by FCSB for trainings. The football complex was built by George Becali (owner of FCSB) on the place of the former ARCOM Concrete Plant, after his club was kicked out from Steaua Stadium and Ghencea Sports Complex due to the conflict with Ministry of National Defence and CSA Steaua București. The football complex has 4 grounds (3 with a grass pitch and 1 with an artificial turf) and holds 1,000 people.

References

External links
Baza Sportivă ARCOM at soccerway.com

Football venues in Romania
Sport in Bucharest
Buildings and structures in Bucharest